Jan Lundell (born ) is a Finnish retired ice hockey goaltender who last played in IFK Helsinki of Liiga. He is currently the goaltending coach for IFK Helsinki.

Lundell holds the record of being the oldest to play in a Liiga game at 46 years old, after a brief return on 9 January 2020 when Atte Engren, the second goaltender, fell sick shortly before the game against SaiPa.

References 

Living people
1973 births
Ice hockey people from Helsinki
HC TPS players
Frölunda HC players
Lahti Pelicans players
Augsburger Panther players
HPK players
Ässät players
Lukko players
Rødovre Mighty Bulls players
Finnish ice hockey goaltenders